Amauropsis subperforata is a deepwater species of sea snail, a marine gastropod mollusc in the family Naticidae.

References

 Powell A. W. B., New Zealand Mollusca, William Collins Publishers Ltd, Auckland, New Zealand 1979 
 Torigoe K. & Inaba A. (2011) Revision on the classification of Recent Naticidae. Bulletin of the Nishinomiya Shell Museum 7: 133 + 15 pp., 4 pls

Naticidae
Gastropods of New Zealand